Veerendra was an Indian film actor, director, producer and writer who made 25 Punjabi-language films in his 12-year career. He made his debut with the film Teri Meri Ek Jindri, released in 1975, featuring Dharmendra. He was a regular in Punjabi films of the 1980s. Some of his more popular films were Lambhardarni, Balbiro Bhabhi and Dushmani Dee Agg, which was released after his death.

Personal life
According to The Times of India, Veerendra's real name was Subhash Dhadwal. He was born in Phagwara. He was shot to death in 1988 and is survived by his wife Pammi and two sons, Randeep and Ramandeep arya.

Filmography 
Dushmani Dee Aag (1990) ... Jeeta
Jatt Soormay (1988) ... Jeeta
Patola (1988) ... Balwant 'Ballu'
Jatt Te Zameen (1987) ... Jeeta
Mera Lahoo (1987) Hindi movie as a director
Vairi Jatt (1985) ... Veer 
Guddo (1985)
Tulsi	(1985) Hindi movie as a director 
Ranjhan Mera Yaar (1984)
Nimmo (1984) ... Karma
Jigri Yaar (1984) ... Karma
Yarri Jatt Di (1984) ... Jeeta
Laajo (1983) ... Jeeta 
Ajj Di Heer (1983) 
Siskiyan (1983) 
Sardara Kartara (1981) ... Kartara
Batwara (1982) ... Karma
Rano (1982) ... Mohna
Sarpanch (1982) ... Karma
Balbeero Bhabi (1981) .... Succha
Khel Muqaddar Ka (1981) 
Lambardarni (1980)...Karma (Movie dubbed in Hindi under the title Khel Muqaddar Ka)
Kunwara Mama (1979)
Saida Jogan (1979)
Jindri Yaar Di (1978)
Giddha (1978) Doctor Balveer
Zehreeli (1977) 
Do Chehere (1977) Hindi film as a  Raj
Santo Banto (1976).... Jeeta
Sawa Lakh Se Ek Ladaun (1976) ... Gafoor Khan
Takkra  (1976)
 Dharam Jeet (1975)
Teri Meri Ik Jindri (1975) .... Jeeta
Insan Aur Insan (1973) ...

References

External links
 

1948 births
1988 deaths
1988 murders in Asia
Deaths by firearm in India
Film directors from Punjab, India
Film producers from Punjab, India
Male actors from Punjab, India
Male actors in Punjabi cinema
Male murder victims
Punjabi-language film directors
20th-century Indian male actors